Zdeněk Chovanec López (born 9 October 2004), otherwise known as Zdeněk Chovanec Jr. or simply Zdeněk Chovanec, is a Czech-Venezuelan racing driver currently competing in the 2022 BOSS GP Series with MM International Motorsport, and the FIA F3 Championship with Charouz Racing System.

He raced with Double R Racing in the Euroformula Open Championship in 2021, and made the switch to FIA F3 with Charouz Racing System prior to round five of the championship, following Reshad de Gerus's departure from the team. Chovanec has previously competed in the 2020 Italian Formula 4 championship.

Early career

Karting 
Originally from the Czech Republic but born in Puerto la Cruz, Venezuela, Chovanec started karting professionally in 2018 at the age of 14, fairly late compared to other drivers.

Lower formulae

2020 
In early 2020 Chovanec made his car racing debut, competing with Xcel Motorsport in the 2020 Formula 4 UAE Championship. He was 7th in the standings with two podium finishes. He then went on to race with Bhaitech in the Italian F4 Championship, finishing 17th in the championship with 18 points.

2021 
Chovanec started 2021 stepping up to the F3 Asian Championship for the first round of the season with BlackArts Racing, and scored points in only his third race. He later signed with Double R Racing to compete in the Euroformula Open Championship. After five rounds in which he generally was a backmarker, he moved to Charouz Racing System to take part in the remaining five events of the 2021 FIA F3 season, replacing Reshad de Gerus. He achieved a best finish of 20th twice and finished second last in the championship.

2022 

In 2022, Chovanec drove for MM International Motorsport in BOSS GP. Chovanec also drove for Charouz Racing System in his return to the 2022 FIA F3 season in Silverstone, replacing Lirim Zendeli. He was retained at Spielberg, where in the feature race he was involved in an accident with teammate Francesco Pizzi, as the Italian spun Chovanec out of the race. However, for the Budapest round, Chovanec was replaced by Christian Mansell. Chovanec ended the season 40th and last in the standings with no points.

Sportscar career 
The 2023 season would see Chovanec making a move to sportscar racing, driving a Mercedes-AMG GT3 Evo for the GetSpeed Performance alongside Lance Bergstein and Aaron Walker in the Silver Cup class of the GT World Challenge Europe Endurance Cup.

Racing record

Karting career summary

Racing career summary 

*Season still in progress.

Complete Formula 4 UAE Championship results 
(key) (Races in bold indicate pole position; races in italics indicate fastest lap)

Complete Italian F4 Championship results 
(key) (Races in bold indicate pole position) (Races in italics indicate fastest lap)

Complete Euroformula Open Championship results 
(key) (Races in bold indicate pole position; races in italics indicate points for the fastest lap of top ten finishers)

Complete FIA Formula 3 Championship results 
(key) (Races in bold indicate pole position; races in italics indicate points for the fastest lap of top ten finishers)

Complete BOSS GP Series results 
(key) (Races in bold indicate pole position; races in italics indicate points for the fastest lap of top ten finishers)

Complete GT World Challenge Europe results

GT World Challenge Europe Endurance Cup 
(Races in bold indicate pole position) (Races in italics indicate fastest lap)

References

External links
  

2004 births
Living people
Italian F4 Championship drivers
Euroformula Open Championship drivers
FIA Formula 3 Championship drivers
People from Puerto la Cruz
Venezuelan racing drivers
Czech racing drivers
Venezuelan people of Czech descent
Bhaitech drivers
Double R Racing drivers
Charouz Racing System drivers
UAE F4 Championship drivers
BlackArts Racing drivers